Sasvand is a village in the Palghar district of Maharashtra, India. It is located in the Dahanu taluka.

Demographics
According to the 2011 census of India, Sasvand has 52 households. The effective literacy rate (i.e. the literacy rate of population excluding children aged 6 and below) is 42.99%.

References

Villages in Dahanu taluka